Kurbatov is a Russian masculine surname, its feminine counterpart is Kurbatova. It may refer to
Alexey Kurbatov (born 1994), Russian cyclist 
Ekaterina Kurbatova (born 1992), Russian gymnast
Evgeny Kurbatov (born 1988), Russian ice hockey defenceman 
Natalya Kurbatova (born 1985), Russian long-distance runner
Stoyanka Kurbatova (born 1955), Bulgarian rower 

Russian-language surnames